The first season of the tattoo reality competition Ink Master debuted on Spike on January 17 and concluded on March 6, 2012, with a total of 8 episodes. The show is hosted and judged by Jane's Addiction guitarist Dave Navarro, with accomplished tattoo artists Chris Núñez and Oliver Peck serving as series regular judges. The winner received a $100,000 prize, a feature in Inked Magazine and the title of Ink Master.

The winner of the first season of Ink Master was Shane O'Neill, with Tommy Helm being the runner-up.

Contestants
Names, ages, and cities stated are at time of filming.

Contestant progress

  The contestant won Ink Master.
 The contestant was the runner-up.
 The contestant finished third in the competition.
 The contestant won Best Tattoo of the Day.
 The contestant was among the top.
 The contestant received positive critiques.
 The contestant received negative critiques.
 The contestant was in the bottom.
 The contestant was eliminated from the competition.

Episodes

References

External links
Official Website
Ink Master on IMDb

2012 American television seasons
Season 1